CS Minaur Baia Mare, commonly known as CS Minaur or simply Minaur, is handball team based in Baia Mare, Maramureș, Romania.

History

HC Minaur Baia Mare was founded on May 15, 1974. Thus, it became the first sports club in the country specializing exclusively in handball. Its name means Gold Mine, referring to the gold mines around Baia Mare. From the very beginning, Minaur has been playing exclusively in the first division of the Romanian handball championship. In the beginning, they played in golden jerseys. The first entry to the Romanian Handball Cup was won by Minaur in 1977/1978. In 1978/79, they reached the semi-finals of the EHF Cup Winners' Cup undefeated, with two victories, where they were dismissed by SC Magdeburg. He will be second in the 1979/80 and 1980/81 seasons. In 1980/81, EHF Cup Winners' Cup reached the semi-finals again, where it was eliminated against TuS Nettelstedt. In these years, Minaur is the only rural team from the Romanian league that plays on the international stage, often much more successfully than the Bucharest clubs. In 1985, he achieved the first Romanian international handball success when he defeated the Soviet ZTR Zaporozhye in the final of the EHF Cup. Then, in 1988, he repeated the success. 24 years after the foundation, in 1998, the dream of every Baia Mare handball lover came true: HC Minaur became the champion of Romania! A year later, in 1999, the success was repeated, the team became champions again. The team was last champion in 2015. In 1979, 1981 and 1986, Minaur reached the semi-finals of the EHF Cup Winners' Cup.

Crest, colours, supporters

Kit manufacturers

Kits

Team

Current squad 

Squad for the 2022–23 season

Technical staff
 Head Coach:  Alexandru Gheorghe Sabou
 Fitness Coach:  Raul Nistor

Transfers
Transfers for the 2023–24 season

Joining 
  Hayder Al-Khafadji (GK) (from  Hammarby IF)

Leaving

Accomplishments

Domestic
Liga Națională:
Gold: 1998, 1999, 2015
Silver: 1980, 1981, 1985, 1992, 1993, 1994, 1995
Bronze: 1974, 1975, 1976, 1978, 1982, 1983, 1984, 1987, 1988, 1989, 1990, 1996, 1997, 2003, 2004, 2005
Cupa României:
Winners: 1978, 1983, 1984, 1989, 1999, 2015
Finalists: 1985

International
EHF Cup:
Winners: 1985, 1988
EHF Cup Winners' Cup: 
Semifinalists: 1979, 1981, 1986

European record

EHF Cup and EHF European League

EHF ranking

Former club members

Notable former players

  Octavian Bizău (2015–2016)
  Ionuț Ciobanu (2019–2021)
  Gheorghe Covaciu (1980–1989)
  Alexandru Csepreghi (2004–2007, 2018–)
  Ștefan Birtalan (1967–1970)
  Iosif Boroș (1977–1987)
  Viorel Fotache (2007–2015, 2022–)
  Valentin Ghionea (2003–2005)
  Radu Ghiță (2015)
  Petru Pop (1992–1999, 2006–2010, 2011–2012)
  Răzvan Pop (2005–2016, 2017–)
  Ionuț Ramba (2015, 2020-2021)
  Marius Sadoveac (2014–2016)
  Alin Șania (2000–2003)
  Maricel Voinea (1977–1989)
  Gabriel Teca (2021–)
  Ivan Karačić (2015–2016)
  Ivan Milas (2014–2015)
  Anderson Mollino (2021–)
  José Toledo (2020–2021)
  Patricio Martínez (2014–2015)
  Teo Čorić (2019–2020)
  Antonio Pribanić (2015–2016)
  Tomáš Číp (2019-)
  Milan Kotrč (2019-)
  Pierre Ragot (2017–2018)
  Nikola Eklemović (2014–2015)
  Tamás Iváncsik (2015–2016)
  Péter Tatai (2014–2016)
  Uroš Vilovski (2015–2016, 2018)
  Stevan Vujović (2021–)
  Inal Aflitulin (2015)
  Cristian Malmagro (2014–2015)
  Miloš Dragaš (2017-2018)
  Stefan Vujić (2021-)
  Artem Kozakevych (2022–)
  Vladyslav Ostroushko (2015–2016)
  Anton Terekhov (2021–)

References

External links
 
 

Romanian handball clubs
Sport in Baia Mare
Handball clubs established in 1974
1974 establishments in Romania
Liga Națională (men's handball)